This was the first edition of the tournament.

Gabriela Cé and Ankita Raina won the title after defeating Elitsa Kostova and Yana Sizikova 6–2, 6–3 in the final.

Seeds

Draw

References
Main Draw

Mençuna Cup - Doubles
Mençuna Cup